Ralph Erskine may refer to:

Ralph Erskine (architect) (1914–2005), British-Swedish architect
Ralph Erskine (cryptologist) (1930–2021), British cryptologist
Ralph Erskine (minister) (1685–1752), Scottish clergyman

sv:Ralph Erskine